Galin Khanom (19th-century) was a royal consort of shah Naser al-Din Shah Qajar of Persia (r. 1848–1896). 

She was the first legal wife of Naser al-Din Shah Qajar. She was an artist and active as a callipgrapher. She also wrote poetry. Several of her work of art are preserved in museums.

References

 

19th-century births
19th-century deaths
19th-century Iranian women
Qajar royal consorts